Tea as a beverage was first consumed in China and the earliest extant mention of tea in literature is the Classic of Poetry, although the ideogram used (荼) in these texts can also designate a variety of plants, such as sowthistle and thrush.

Chinese literature contains a significant number of ancient treatises on tea.  Together, there exist approximately one hundred monographs or treatises on tea published from the Tang dynasty through the end of the Ming dynasty.  The more famous books on tea are listed below.

Chinese

Tang Dynasty
The Classic of Tea (茶經) by Lu Yu, 780.
Report on Water for Brewing Tea by Zhang Youxin, 814.
Records of Tea Picking (采茶录 Chai Cha Lu) by Wen Tingyun (温庭筠), 860.

Song Dynasty 
The Record of Tea (茶录) by Cai Xiang (蔡襄), 1049.
Report on Tasting of East Brook Tea (东溪试茶录 Dong Qi Shi Cha Lu) by Song Zian (宋子安), 1064. Translation by Global Tea Hut.
Treatise on Tea (大观茶论) by Emperor Song Huizong (宋徽宗), 1107.
Record of Xuan He Era Tribute Tea in The North Farm (宣和北苑贡茶录 Xuan He Bei Yuan Gong Cha Lu) by  Xiong Fan (熊蕃).
Essential Record of Tea Tasting(品茶要录 Pin Cha Yiao Lu) by  Huang Ru (黄儒), 1075.
Pictorial of Tea Ware (茶具图赞) by The Old Man Shenan (审安老人).

Ming Dynasty
Zhu Quan (朱权): Cha Pu (茶谱), 1440. Translation by Global Tea Hut. Translation by John Thompson.
Gu Yuanqing (顾元庆): Classification of Tea (茶谱 Cha Pu), 1541. Translation by Global Tea Hut.
Lu Shusheng (陆树声): A Report on Tea House (茶寮记 Cha Liao Ji), 1570.
Tu Long (屠隆): Kao Pan Yu Shi (考槃余事), or Desultory Remarks on Furnishing the Abode of the Retired Scholar, ca 1590.
 Gao Lian (高濂): Eight Discourses on the Art of Living/ Tea (遵生八笺 Jun Sheng Ba Jian), 1591.
 Hu Wenhuan (胡文焕): Tea Collection (茶集), 1593.
 Chen Shi (陈师): Research on Tea (茶考 Cha Kao), 1593.
 Chen Jiru (陈继儒): Tea Talks (茶话), 1595.
 Zhang Yuan (张源): Tea Notes (茶录), 1595. Translation by The Leaf.
 Zhang Qiande (张谦德): The Book of Tea (茶经), 1598.
 Xiong Mingyu (熊明遇): Report on Lu Jie Tea, (罗岕茶记 Luo Jie Cha Ji), ca 1608.
 Feng Shike (冯时可): Tea Record (茶录 Cha Lu), 1609.
 Wen Zhenheng (文震亨): Treatise on Superfluous Things/ Incense and Tea (长物志 Zhang Wu Zhi), 1621.  Translation by Martin Tai. Translation by Global Tea Hut.
Wen Long (闻龙): Tea Notes (茶笺 Cha Jian), 1630. Translation by Global Tea Hut.
Zhou Gaoqi (周高起): Treatise On Yixing Tea Pot (阳羡茗壶系 Yangxian Ming Hu Xi), 1640.
Zhou Gaoqi: Report on Tongshan Jie Tea (洞山岕茶系 Tongshan Jie Cha Xi), 1640.

Qing Dynasty
 Lu Tingcan (陸廷燦): The Sequel to Classic of Tea (續茶經).

Japanese
 Myōan Eisai (明菴栄西): Treatise on Tea Drinking for Health (喫茶養生記), 1193.
Eisai (Yosai) came to Tiantai mountain of Zhejiang to study Chan (Zen) Buddhism (1168 AD); when he returned home in 1193 AD, he brought tea from China to Japan, planted it and wrote the first Japanese treatise on tea, called Kissa yojoki (喫茶養生記, Treatise on Drinking Tea for Health). This was the beginning of tea cultivation and tea culture in Japan.
 Sen no Rikyū (千利休) (1522 – April 21, 1591): Southern Record (南方録).

English
 Okakura Kakuzō (岡倉 覚三): The Book of Tea (originally written in English by Okakura), 1906.
 A Nice Cup of Tea essay by George Orwell, 1946.
 ISO 3103 specifying a standardized method for brewing tea, by the International Organization for Standardization (commonly referred to as ISO), 1980 revised 2019.
 How to make a Perfect Cup of Tea, debunking Orwell, by Andrew Stapley for the Royal Society of Chemistry, 2003.
 How To Make a Decent Cup of Tea, inspired by Orwell, by Christopher Hitchens, 2011.

Translations

Modern Chinese
 陆羽《茶经》 －解读与点校, 程启坤 杨招棣 姚国坤. 上海 上海文艺出版社 2003 
 茶经 
 遵生八笺——白话全译, 重庆大学出版社

Czech
 Lu Jü : Kniha o čaji. Translated by Olga Lomová. Spolek milců čaje a DharmaGaia, Praha, 2002, .
 Karel Valter : Vše o čaji pro čajomily, Granit s.r.o., Praha, 2000

English
  The Classic of Tea Lu, Yu; Intro & Translation By Francis Ross Carpenter, Illustrated by Hitz, Demi;Boston, MA: Little, Brown & Co. 1974
 The Classic of Tea: Origins & Rituals Lu, Yu; Yu, Lu; Carpenter, Francis Ross;  New York, U.S.A.: Ecco Press. 1995 reprint of 1974 edition. This is a complete translation.

French
Vianney, Soeur Jean-Marie: Le Classique Du The Par Lu Yu, Morel - 1977

Hungarian
 Lu Jü: Teáskönyv – A teázás szent könyve a nyolcadik századi Kínából. (Translation By Zsolt Tokaji and Barbara Nyiredy.) Terebess Kiadó, Budapest 2005, 
 Teáskönyv. (Trans., ed, by Zsolt Tokaji.) Fapadoskonyv.hu, Budapest, 2010.

Italian
 Lu Yu: IL CANONE DEL TÈ, Traduzione (dal cinese) di Marco Ceresa, Leonardo. November 1990.
 Marco Ceresa, Ph.D.  Dissertation:I trattati sul tè di epoca Tang (Tang Dynasty Monographs on Tea) Far Eastern Studies, Istituto Universitario Orientale of Naples.1992

Russian
Лу Юй: Канон чая; перевод с древнекитайского, введение и комментарии Александра Габуева и Юлии Дрейзис. Москва: Гуманитарий, 2007. — 123 с.

See also
History of tea in China

References

Further reading 
 Okakura Kakuzo, The Illustrated Book of Tea (Okakura's classic illustrated with 17th-19th century ukiyo-e woodblock prints of Japanese tea culture). Chiang Mai: Cognoscenti Books. 2012. ASIN: B009033C6M
 Preface to  Cha Jing 茶经, Wu Zhihe  
 Shapira, et al., Book of Coffee and Tea, 1996.

 
Works about tea